Mother Meera, born Kamala Reddy (born 26 December 1960) is believed by her devotees to be an embodiment (Avatar) of the Divine Mother (Shakti or Devi).

Life account

Born in Chandepally a small village in the Yadadri Bhuvanagiri district of Telangana, India, she allegedly had her first samādhi, a state of complete spiritual absorption, at the age of six, which lasted for a whole day. When she was 12 her uncle Bulgur Venkat Reddy met her for the first time, and was convinced that the girl had already appeared to him in the form of visions. He came to believe that she is the Divine Mother and started to take care of her, allowing her to unfold her inner experiences. Her parents Antamma and Veera Reddy live in Madanapalle, Chittoor district of Andhra Pradesh.

In 1974, uncle Reddy brought Mother Meera to the Sri Aurobindo Ashram in Pondicherry, India, of which he was a member. There she first met Westerners and started to give darshan. She is however not associated with the Sri Aurobindo Ashram today. In 1979 she was invited by her first devotees to Canada, where she went several times. Meanwhile, uncle Reddy's health started to deteriorate.

In 1981 she made her first trip to West Germany, where she, together with uncle Reddy and her close companion Adilakshmi, settled down a year later. She married a German in 1982. Uncle Reddy died in 1985 and was buried in the local cemetery in Dornburg-Thalheim, Hesse. For some years now, she has been giving darshan (literally seeing, primarily in a spiritual context) at Schloss Schaumburg in Balduinstein, a small town in Germany. Previously, in the early 1990s, she gave darshan in a house in the town of Thalheim, some 5 km northwest of Hadamar in Germany. She also visits the United States on a regular basis (see links below).

Activities

Mother Meera receives thousands of visitors of all religions for darshan which she conducts in total silence. Her darshan consists of a ritual, where she will touch a person's head, and then look into their eyes. During this process, she reportedly 'unties knots' in the person's subtle system and permeates them with light. She doesn't charge any money for doing so and she will not give lectures. Mother Meera's reported task on Earth was in calling down a dynamic light-force from the Supreme (Paramatman – the supreme Self) in collaboration with other saints and divine beings, as she says, making spiritual progress on earth easier. About this light she says:

Through Japa, the mental remembrance of any Divine Name or Mantra, which may be done informally, and whenever convenient, people could open themselves up to this Light. She does not claim to be a guru or have followers. To be connected to her work, people do not have to recognise her. Her teaching is mainly related to Bhakti, that is devotion to God, and in that she accepts all denominations.

Mother Meera does not belong to any particular tradition, except for a certain closeness to the work of Sri Aurobindo and the Mother, whom she was reported to have met in their subtle bodies, when she was a child, visiting their Samadhi (grave). She teaches the unity of all religions. Everyone can go their own ways. It is only important to be connected with the light (the personal spiritual role model) every day by praying, reading or meditating.

Critics 
After splitting from Mother Meera, the writer and former follower Andrew Harvey wrote The Sun at Midnight. In it, Harvey accused Meera of homophobia, saying that Mother Meera disapproved of Harvey's marriage to another man. In his first book about her, Hidden Journey, Harvey had originally praised her as an avatar, attributing his own claimed enlightenment to her. Harvey's accusation of homophobia is disputed. One of Harvey's former lovers, the writer Mark Matousek (1997), said that: "I do know that the idea that she's homophobic is completely ridiculous. For God's sake, we were served breakfast in bed together in her house."

Books
Answers, Part I – by Mother Meera, 
Answers, Part II – by Mother Meera,

Quotes

"One common mistake is to think that one reality is the reality. You must always be prepared to leave one reality for a greater one." – Answers, Part I

See also
 Meera

Notes

Further reading
The Mother – by Adilakshmi, 
At the Feet of Mother Meera: The Lessons of Silence – by Sonia Linebaugh, 
Hidden Journey: A Spiritual Awakening – by Andrew Harvey, 
In Search of the Divine Mother: The Mystery of Mother Meera – by Martin Goodman, 
Sex Death Enlightenment – Mark Matousek (1997), Riverhead books,

External links

 Mother Meera Germany
 Mother Meera Foundation USA
 Darshan in the UK
 Mother Meera school in India
 Mere Meera (official french site)
 Matka Meera (official czech site)
 Mark Matousek on Mother Meera
 An experience of Darshan with Mother Meera

1960 births
Living people
20th-century Hindu religious leaders
21st-century Hindu religious leaders
20th-century Indian women
20th-century Indian people
21st-century Indian women
21st-century Indian people
German Hindus
German people of Indian descent
Indian Hindu saints
Indian women religious leaders
People considered avatars by their followers
People from Nalgonda
Telugu people
Women mystics